Adolf "Dolfi" Freiburghaus (27 March 1910 – 20 April 1974) was a Swiss cross-country skier. He competed in the men's 18 kilometre event at the 1936 Winter Olympics.

References

1910 births
1974 deaths
Swiss male cross-country skiers
Olympic cross-country skiers of Switzerland
Cross-country skiers at the 1936 Winter Olympics
Place of birth missing